Maja is a Slavic and German feminine given name.

It can be a short form of Marija, Maria, Mary or Magdalena in Europe (Germany, Scandinavian countries, Slovenia, Croatia, Serbia, North Macedonia).

It can be a spelling variation of Maya.

Notable persons with the name
 Maja Aleksić, Serbian volleyball player
 Maja Alm, Danish athlete
 Maja Apostoloska, Macedonian writer
 Maja Berezowska, Polish painter
 Maja Blagdan, Croatian singer
 Maja Bogdanović, Serbian-French cellist
 Maja Cvjetković, Croatian model
 Maja Einstein, sister of Albert Einstein
 Maja Gojković, Serbian politician
 Maja Grønbæk, Danish handball player
 Maja Hill, Macedonian artist
 Maja Hoffmann (born 1956), Swiss art collector and businesswoman
 Maja Hug, Swiss figure skater
 Maja Ivarsson, Swedish singer
 Maja Kersnik, Slovenian badminton player
 Maja Keuc, Slovenian singer
 Maja Komorowska, Polish actress
 Maja Latinović, Serbian model
 Maja Lidia Kossakowska, Polish writer
 Maja Marijana, Serbian singer
 Maja Matevžič, Slovenian tennis player
 Maja Nekić, Croatian actress
 Maja Ognjenović, Serbian volleyball player
 Maja Ostaszewska, Polish actress
 Maja Poljak, Croatian volleyball player
 Maja Ratkje, Norwegian musician
 Maja Refsum, Norwegian sculptor
 Maja Salvador, Filipino actress
 Maja Savić, Montenegrin handball player
 Maja Savić (volleyball), Serbian volleyball player
 Maja Simanić, Serbian volleyball player
 Maja Sokač, Croatian handball player
 Maja Tatić, Serbian singer
 Maja Trochimczyk, Polish-American writer
 Maja Vojnović, Slovenian handball player
 Maja Włoszczowska, Polish mountain biker
Rika Maja, Sámi noaidi (d. 1757)

Feminine given names
Serbian feminine given names
Scandinavian feminine given names